Amolatar is a town in Northern Uganda. It is the main municipal, administrative and commercial centre of Amolatar District. The district is named after the town.

Location
The coordinates of the town are:01 38 06N, 32 49 30E (Latitude:1.6350; Longitude:32.8250).

Population
In 2002, the national population census estimated the town's population at about 11,420. In 2010, the Uganda Bureau of Statistics (UBOS), estimated the population of the town at 14,300. In 2011, UBOS estimated the mid-year population of Amolatar at 14,800.

In 2015, UBOS estimated the population of the town at 11,400. In 2020, the population agency estimated the population of Amolatar Town Council at 12,900 inhabitants; of whom 6,400 (49.6 percent) were females and 6,500 (50.4 percent) were males. UBOS calculated that the population of the town, increased at an average rate of 2.6 percent annually, between 2015 and 2020.

Points of interest
The following points of interest lie within the town limits or close to the edges of the town: (a) the headquarters of Amolatar District Administration (b) the offices of Amolatar Town Council (c) the Amolatar Monument which marks the geographic centre of Uganda and (d) Amolatar Health Centre IV, administered by the Uganda Ministry of Health.

See also
Lango sub-region
Langi
List of cities and towns in Uganda

References

External links
 Floods displace 400, set to submerge district offices As of 12 July 2021.

Amolatar District
Populated places in Northern Region, Uganda
Cities in the Great Rift Valley
Lango sub-region